Xylotoles fasciatus is a species of beetle in the family Cerambycidae. It was described by Sharp in 1886. It is known from New Zealand.

References

Dorcadiini
Beetles described in 1886